Outrageous Acts of Science is a science program shown on Science Channel in the U.S., featuring a fast-paced countdown of the top 20 internet videos in each episode. The series first aired in the UK on Discovery International with the title You Have Been Warned. The program features homemade science experiments and stunts, often accompanied by warnings of "don't try this at home" when doing so might endanger the viewer.  For the U.S. TV network, it was the top-rated show of 2015.

Each episode focuses on a particular science theme that features the cleverest, funniest, most daring, or just downright bizarre clips, along with an explanation and breakdown from science and engineering experts, including Hakeem Oluseyi,  Debbie Berebichez, Carin Bondar and also-comedians Helen Arney, Matt Parker, Adam Ruben, and Tom Wrigglesworth, among others.  The expert panel's explanations are accompanied with storytelling motion graphics and an explanation of what, how and why these clips were scientifically possible.

Outrageous Acts of Science is narrated by Tim Dadabo, while Gareth Cornick voices You Have Been Warned for Europe.  In mid 2017, the last ten episodes of season seven aired on Discovery Channel (Australia) as Dr. Karl's Outrageous Acts of Science, hosted by Dr. Karl Kruszelnicki, with commentary by other Australians not seen in other versions of the show.

The first two seasons of You Have Been Warned are shown in Asia as well, with the third season of Outrageous Acts also airing there under the You Have Been Warned banner and intro.  Two separate Asian versions were also created. In the first, titled You Have Been Warned with Ean Nasrun, Malaysian radio announcer and TV personality Ean Nasrun voices and appears on-screen in a separate version that aired on Discovery Channel Asia, along with some commentators' clips replaced by those featuring scientists from Malaysia. A second independent version, You Have Been Warned Asia, is also produced by Rohit Tharani for Discovery Channel Asia, hosted by five Filipinos, actor/comedian Ramon Bautista; director and performer RA Rivera; comedic performer Jun Sabayton; musician, TV presenter, and political commentator Lourd de Veyra; and actress, TV presenter, and motoring journalist Angel Rivero. The hosts provide the science behind the clips themselves rather than relying in a separate commentator panel in an edgier, more comedic take on the series.

The series is produced by October Films UK.  In its tenth season, new episodes began airing in the U.S. on 17 October 2018.  The first four episodes of season six were compilations of previous clips.
A one-season spin-off called Outrageous Acts of Psych aired in the U.S. in 2015.

Experts

Episodes
U.S. airdates and selected clip examples from each episode.

Season 1
 Homemade Heroes - April 20, 2013
 Human Guinea Pigs - April 27, 2013
 Natural Born Thrillers - May 4, 2013
 Epic Stunts - May 11, 2013
 Power Junkies - May 18, 2013
 Dukes of Havoc - May 25, 2013

Season 2
 Kings of Carnage - February 15, 2014 -Destruction in the name of science, including using an MRI machine to destroy objects.
 Show Offs - February 22, 2014 - Skills including tightrope walking between two trucks, a walrus that whistles, and a needle thrown through glass but not shattering it.
 Daredevils - March 1, 2014 - Daredevil stunts, including "surfing" on a high-speed train, a dog walking on a tightrope, a motocross on water, "brain freeze", a backflipping car, jumping onto a cactus, and a skydiver walking from plane to plane.
 Zeros to Heroes - March 8, 2014 - A Mexican firework hammer, freezing a tongue to a lamppost, superglue, and an easily scared man.
 When Nature Calls - March 15, 2014 - A gorilla that walks like a person, clouds formed indoors, surfing glacier runoff, a wrong way to feed a crocodile, and a man that gets dangerously close to volcanoes.
 Human Lab Rats - March 29, 2014 - Self-experimentation, including speed eating, a bot fly larva in a person's scalp, and a helicopter powered by a person.
 The People's Vote - April 5, 2014 - The best of the first 12 episodes.
 Masters of the Universe - April 12, 2014 - Vertical driving, a high-speed hammock, a man without a fear of heights, RC helicopter maneuvers, and a supersonic ping pong ball.
 Freaks of Nature - April 19, 2014 - Featuring a washcloth wrung in outer space, a backwards-driving car, a "human axe" (Quantrel Bishop), naked at the South Pole, and using animals to catch animals.
 Backyard Boffins - May 3, 2014 - Backyard boffins, including a triple backflip on a BMX bike, homemade civil defense siren, and a submarine made from a propane tank.
 Hackaverse - May 10, 2014  - Life hacks, featuring an inflatable snowmobile, a shopping cart rocket, an orchestra from drinking glasses, an explosion of gummy bears, bedbug "tattoos", and a car driven by an iPad.
 Heroes and Hoaxers - May 17, 2014
 Greatest Hits II - May 24, 2014 - The best clips from season two, as chosen by the scientists.
 Most Dangerous - July 5, 2014
 Biggest Explosions - July 12, 2014
 Coolest Inventions - July 19, 2014
 Worst Ideas - July 26, 2014
 Craziest Driving - August 2, 2014
 Greatest Hoaxes - August 9, 2014
 Wildest Nature - August 16, 2014
 Weirdest Science - August 16, 2014  (EP Guides)

Season 3
 Fact or Fake? - January 17, 2015  - Underwater BASE jumping and a billiards trick shot.
 License to Thrill - January 24, 2015
 Kings of Creation - January 31, 2015 - Ridiculous inventions, like a car that skips a jump rope, a robot that always wins at Rock Paper Scissors, and a single-wheeled motorbike.
 Born to Be Wild - February 7, 2015  - More daredevils, including an avalanche survivor, a man who can hold his breath for more than 22 minutes, and one who walks between hot-air balloons a few thousand feet (over a kilometer) above ground.
 Grand Masters - February 14, 2015 - A man drifting two cars at once, a snake able to open a door, and a three-year-old basketball player.
 Tested on Humans - February 21, 2015 - A man who pops his eyes out of their sockets, contagious yawning, and a bike helmet with an emergency airbag.
 Lord of the Elements - February 28, 2015 - A skydiver with a jetpack, levitating objects, and a solar car.
 Cowboys of Chaos - March 7, 2015  - A homemade cannon, exploded houses, and magnets that can crush a person's hand.
 Epic Fails - March 14, 2015 - An extreme surfing wipeout, the hardest tongue twister, and a man with an extreme fear of lobsters.
 Urban Legends - March 21, 2015 - Home inventions, including a dangerous electric bike, a submarine under human power, and a full-sized car made of Legos.

Season 4
 Fact or Fiction - June 20, 2015 - Snow skiing on Hawaii's Mauna Kea, a wingsuit pilot towed by a car, a great white shark encounter, driving vertically, and a handgun trick shot.
 Summer Wipeout - June 22, 2015
 Kings Of Summer - June 23, 2015
 Fan Favorites - June 27, 2015
 No Limits - July 11, 2015 - A world-record truck jump, the world's fastest electric motorcycle, a 90-year-old gymnast, and a skydiver and wingsuit pilot who form a human flying carpet.
 Win or Fail - July 18, 2015 - A spinning skydiver, a wasabi prank, and car jump that is the longest ever attempted.
 Demolition Derby - July 25, 2015  - A man's finger that pokes through coconuts, a nearly indestructible Batman suit, and a  robotic hand that can crush cars while controlled by a person with a glove.
 Superhuman - August 1, 2015  - Walking on the ceiling with magnets, a knife/nunchuck master, a small arm-wrestler taking on a bodybuilder, and a man runs a loop-the-loop.
 Forces of Nature - August 8, 2015 - A shark rescue, leeches as first aid, and a cluster balloon aircraft made of a lawn chair, helium balloons, and a "pilot" with shotgun.
 Insane Inventions - August 15, 2015 - A car with color-changing paint, an model rocket that reaches the edge of space, a flying car, and a stunt machine that crosses a skateboard and tank.
 Weird Science - August 22, 2015 - A ghost ship made of light projected into sprayed water, a bear with a human-like walk, and an uphill tightrope walk.

Season 5
 Like A Boss - January 9, 2016
 Is This for Real? - January 16, 2016
 Man vs. Nature - January 23, 2016
 Epic Skills - January 30, 2016
 Homemade Hotshots - February 6, 2016
 Wild Rides - February 13, 2016
 Brain Vs. Brawn - February 20, 2016
 Killer Builds - February 27, 2016
 Facepalm - March 5, 2016
 Shock and Awesome - March 12, 2016

Season 6

 Not Safe for Work  - June 22, 2016
 Wild Things - June 29, 2016
 Beast Mode - July 6, 2016
 Transformers - July 13, 2016
 Punked? - July 20, 2016
 Nailed It - July 27, 2016
 Garage Genius - August 3, 2016
 Man vs. Animal - August 10, 2016
 Don't Tell Mom

Season 7
 Power Hungry - October 26, 2016
 Accident or Design - November 2, 2016
 Movers and Makers - November 9, 2016
 Power Up - November 16, 2016
 Game Changers - January 4, 2017
 Neighborhood Watch - January 11, 2017
 Beta Testers - January 18, 2017
 Fearless or Foolish - January 25, 2017
 Amped Up - February 1, 2017
 Truth or Troll - February 8, 2017
 Natural Selection - February 15, 2017
 Epic Elements - February 22, 2017
 Crowd Pleasers - March 1, 2017
 Moguls of Mayhem - March 8, 2017
 Pure Power - March 15, 2017
 Bucket List - March 22, 2017
 Mind Benders - March 29, 2017

Season 8
 Life Hackers - June 20, 2017
 Tons of Anarchy - June 27, 2017
 Bragging Rights - July 4, 2017
 Very Innovative People - July 11, 2017
 Seriously? - July 18, 2017
 Ground Breakers - July 25, 2017
 No Brainers - August 1, 2017
 Body Rockers - August 8, 2017
 Rebooters - August 22, 2017
 Masters of Disasters - August 29, 2017

Season 9
 Strangest Things - February 27, 2018
 Mod Fathers - March 6, 2018
 Owned It - March 13, 2018
 Supernatural - March 20, 2018
 How Not To - March 26, 2018
 MVPs - April 3, 2018
 Power Trippin' - April 10, 2018
 Masters of Mayhem - April 17, 2018
 Ultimate Upgraders - April 24, 2018
 Mind Blown - May 1, 2018

Season 10
 Quantum Leaps - October 16, 2018
 Only Natural - October 23, 2018
 Savage Skills - October 30, 2018
 This Changes Everything - November 6, 2018
 Make It Real - November 13, 2018
Overachievers
Supercharged
Super Weird
Controlled Chaos
Unusual Suspects

References

External links
 Official Website
 

Discovery Channel original programming
Science Channel original programming
Science education television series
2013 American television series debuts
2010s American video clip television series